Rivungo  is a town and municipality in Cuando Cubango Province in Angola. It is situated on the Cuando River. The municipality had a population of 33,053 inhabitants in 2014.

References

Populated places in Cuando Cubango Province
Municipalities of Angola